Ponnai is a Town panchayat which is located in the Vellore District within the state of Tamil Nadu. Ponnai Panchayat  is composed of 18 villages, with Ponnai serving as the head town.

Transport
Nearby towns are linked by rail and air. Frequent buses are available to Vellore, Tiruttani, Arcot, and Sholinghur.  Buses to Chittoor, Chennai, Bangalore, Tirupathi, Kanchipuram, Tambaram, and Chengalpattu run less frequently.

The nearest railway stations are Chittoor in Andhra Pradesh, and Vellore Katpadi Junction in Tamil Nadu.

The nearest port is in Chennai, and the nearest airports are Tirupathi in Andhra Pradesh, Chennai in Tamil Nadu, and Vellore Airport.

Politics
The Katpadi assembly constituency is part of the Arakkonam (Lok Sabha constituency).

References

Cities and towns in Vellore district